Michael Vince (born 1947) is a British poet and author. He was educated at Emanuel School and King's College, Cambridge, where he read English under Tony Tanner and began friendships with the poets Dick Davis, Robert Wells and Clive Wilmer. He taught for the British Council in Greece for many years and now lives in London.
 
Vince won a Gregory Award in 1977. He has since published a number of books and pamphlets, most recently Plain Text in 2015 and Long Distance in 2020. He has appeared in numerous magazines in the UK and USA, including Outposts, Southern Review, PN Review, Encounter, Times Literary Supplement, London Review of Books, Numbers, La Fontana and Verse.  
 
Vince has also published a number of best-selling ELT course books and grammars, including Highlight, and the Language Practice series.

Works

Poetry
 The Orchard Well (Carcanet, 1978)
 Mountain, Epic and Dream	(Bran's Head, 1981)
 In the New District (Carcanet, 1982)
 Gaining Definition (Robert L Barth, 1986)
 Plain Text (Mica, 2015)
 Twelve Poems of Michael Vince  (www.michaelvince.co.uk, 2016)
  Long Distance (Mica, 2020)
  A Conversation with George Seferis (Rack, 2022)

Anthology contributions
 Young Winter’s Tales (Macmillan)
 The River’s Voice (Common Ground)
 Trees Be Company (Common Ground) 
 A Calendar of Modern Poetry (PN Review, 1991)
 Baudelaire in English (Penguin, 1998)

References

External links
 Twelve Poems of Michael Vince (official web site)
 Macmillan English author profile
 Archive of Carcanet Press - Administrative Papers, University of Manchester Library
 
 

1947 births
Living people
People educated at Emanuel School
Alumni of King's College, Cambridge
English male poets